Calliandra californica, the Baja fairy duster, is an evergreen, woody shrub, native to Baja California, Mexico. In Spanish, the plant is also known vernacularly as tabardillo, zapotillo or chuparosa. The flowers, which appear in early summer, have clusters of red stamens. The shrub is usually  in height and has bipinnate leaves. The leaves have been described as "fern-like." Leaves close at night time.

It grows best in full sun. C. californica is very drought tolerant, needing only  of water every year. However, additional watering will encourage C. californica to bloom through summer and again in the fall.

Propagation of C. californica is done through "acid scarification" or vegetative cutting. Seed pods from this plant look like "snow peas" and when ripe, they explode. After ejecting seeds, the curled open pods remain attached to the plant for some time.

Calliandra californica attracts both bees and hummingbirds.

Along with many other legumes and leadworts (Plumbago), it is a host plant for the Marine Blue caterpillar (Leptotes marina).

In landscaping, it is suggested that C. californica is used in borders or foreground plantings, as an island accent or even in containers.

References

Further reading
The University of Arizona Cooperative Extension: Calliandra californica

californica
Flora of Baja California
Flora of Baja California Sur
Taxa named by George Bentham
Plants described in 1844